The Tim Hortons Spitfire Arms Cash Spiel (known originally as the Spitfire Arms Cash Spiel) is an annual bonspiel, or curling tournament, held at the Windsor Curling Club in Windsor, Nova Scotia. It was held as part of the women's World Curling Tour from 2015 to 2019 and was part of the men's Tour from 2015 to 2017. The tournament is held in a round robin format.

Past Champions

Women

Men

References

Women's curling competitions in Canada
Curling competitions in Nova Scotia
Hants County, Nova Scotia